Jonca is an unincorporated community in Ste. Genevieve County, in the U.S. state of Missouri.

History
A post office called Jonca was established in 1880, and remained in operation until 1906. The community took its name from Jonca Creek.

References

Unincorporated communities in Ste. Genevieve County, Missouri
Unincorporated communities in Missouri